This is a list of islands of Nicaragua. There are 160 islands in Nicaragua on both the Caribbean Sea, Pacific Ocean and inland lakes.

Islands 

Calala Island, 
Corn Islands (little corn island, big corn island), 
Cayos Miskitos, 
Pearl Cays, 
Rama Cay
Ometepe Island
Solentiname Islands
Islets of Granada
Zapatera Island
Island of Maracon (Lake Nicaragua)
Island San Fernado (Lake Nicaragua)
Island Maracarronicta (Lake Nicaragua)
El Carmen Island
Santa Rosa Island 
Island Colorada 
Island de San Anderes
Island Muncos
Island Puerto del Bluff
 Venado Island

See also

 Geography of Nicaragua

References 

Islands
Nicaragua